The 2016 FIBA U18 European Championship was the 33rd edition of the FIBA U18 European Championship. The competition was originally scheduled to take place in Samsun, Turkey, from 30 July to 7 August 2016, but was postponed indefinitely due to the political unrest in the country at the time. On 30 September 2016, FIBA decided that the tournament would take place from 16 to 22 December 2016. The top five teams qualified for the 2017 FIBA Under-19 World Championship.

France won their fourth title in this event by beating Lithuania in the final, 75–68.

Participating teams
 
 

   (Runners-up, 2015 FIBA Europe Under-18 Championship Division B)

  (Third place, 2015 FIBA Europe Under-18 Championship Division B)

  (Winners, 2015 FIBA Europe Under-18 Championship Division B)

First round
In this round, the 16 teams are allocated in four groups of four teams each. The top two teams from each group will advance to the Quarterfinals. The bottom two teams from each group will play classification games for 9th to 16th spot.

Group A

Group B

Group C

Group D

Classification round

9th–16th place classification

9th–16th place quarterfinals

13th–16th place semifinals

9th–12th place semifinals

15th place game

13th place game

Eleventh place game

Ninth place game

5th–8th place classification

5th–8th place semifinals

Seventh place game

Fifth place game

Final round

Quarterfinals

Semifinals

Third place game

Final

Final standings

Awards

All-Tournament Team 
 PG –  Davide Moretti
 SG –  Frank Ntilikina (MVP)
 SF –  Sekou Doumbouya 
 PF –  Tadas Sedekerskis
 C –  Isaiah Hartenstein

References

External links
FIBA official website

 
2016
2016–17 in European basketball
2016–17 in Turkish basketball
2016
2016
December 2016 sports events in Europe